The Spiralia are a morphologically diverse clade of protostome animals, including within their number the molluscs, annelids, platyhelminths and other taxa. The term Spiralia is applied to those phyla that exhibit canonical spiral cleavage, a pattern of early development found in most (but not all) members of the Lophotrochozoa.

Distribution of spiralian development across phylogeny

Members of the molluscs, annelids, platyhelminths and nemerteans have all been shown to exhibit spiral cleavage in its classical form. Other spiralian phyla (rotifers, brachiopods, phoronids, gastrotrichs, and bryozoans) are also said to display a derived form of spiral cleavage in at least a portion of their constituent species, although evidence for this is sparse.

Lophotrochozoa within Spiralia

Previously, spiral cleavage was thought to be unique to the Spiralia in the strictest sense—animals such as molluscs and annelids which exhibit classical spiral cleavage. The presence of spiral cleavage in animals such as platyhelminths could be difficult to correlate with some phylogenies.

Evidence of a close relationship between molluscs, annelids and lophophorates was found in 1995 and Lophotrochozoa was defined as the group containing these taxa and all the descendants of their last common ancestor. More recent research has established the Lophotrochozoa as a superphylum within the Metazoa.
With this understanding, the presence of spiral cleavage in polyclad platyhelminths, as well as the more traditional Spiralia, has led to the hypothesis that spiral cleavage was present ancestrally across the Lophotrochozoa as a whole.
With the introduction of Platytrochozoa and Rouphozoa, the cladogram is as follows, with an indication approximately how many million years ago (Mya) the clades radiated into newer clades.

An alternative phylogeny was given in 2019, with a basal grouping Mollusca with Entoprocta grouping named Tetraneuralia, and a second grouping of Nemertea with Platyhelminthes named Parenchymia as sister of Annelida. In their proposal and according to the original definition, Lophotrochozoa may become a senior synonym for Platytrochozoa. 

In 2019 the Rouphozoa was recovered again as a basal Platytrochozoa clade.

References

Protostome unranked clades